St. Peter's Umbrella (Hungarian: Szent Péter esernyöje) is a 1917 Hungarian silent drama film directed by Alexander Korda and starring Károly Lajthay, Márton Rátkai and Victor Varconi. It was an adaptation of the 1895 novel St. Peter's Umbrella by Kálmán Mikszáth. Two adaptations were made later in 1935 and in 1958.

Cast
 Károly Lajthay - Vicar Bély 
 Márton Rátkai   
 Victor Varconi   
 Ica von Lenkeffy   
 Charles Puffy   
 József Kürthy   
 József Hajdú  
 Marcsa Simon  
 Gyula Bartos  
 Mari K. Demjén

References

Bibliography
 Kulik, Karol. Alexander Korda: The Man Who Could Work Miracles. Virgin Books, 1990.

External links

1917 films
Hungarian silent films
Hungarian drama films
1910s Hungarian-language films
Films directed by Alexander Korda
Films based on Hungarian novels
Hungarian black-and-white films
1917 drama films
1917 Austro-Hungarian films
Silent drama films